Morris Multimedia, Inc. is a media company based in Savannah, Georgia, founded in 1970 by Charles H. Morris. Morris Multimedia is the parent company of Morris Newspaper Corporation and Morris Network. The company's offices are in the Oliver Sturges House at 27 Abercorn Street in Savannah.

Newspapers 
The Morris Newspaper Corporation division owns and operates over 65 publications including dailies, shoppers, and specialty magazines in nine states and the Caribbean.

Daily newspapers
 Great Bend Tribune - Great Bend, Kansas
 Manteca Bulletin - Manteca, California
 The Gainesville Times - Gainesville, Georgia
 The Ceres Courier - Turlock, California

Weekly newspapers
 Connect Savannah - Savannah, Georgia
 Statesboro Herald - Statesboro, Georgia

Television
Morris Multimedia has its own broadcasting division, Morris Network, who owns and operates several television stations. In 2003, Morris Multimedia announced that they would sell KARK in Little Rock, Arkansas and WDHN in Dothan, Alabama to Nexstar Broadcasting Group for an undisclosed price. Later that year, it purchased WCBI in Columbus from Imes Communications for an undisclosed price. Between 2006 and 2008, Morris Multimedia purchased two television stations from Media General. These were WDEF-TV in Chattanooga and WTVQ-DT in Lexington. The former was part of the acquisition that Media General also saw that they would purchase the smaller NBC O&Os, while the latter was to reduce debt flow Media General had invested in. Also in 2006, it purchased WWAY from Raycom Media for $18.5 million as part of divestures regarding of Raycom's acquisition of Liberty Corporation.

Current Morris network stations

Former Morris TV stations

Morris Technology 
Morris also owns Morris Technology, a company specialising in infrastructural services for the media industry.

References

External links
www.morrismultimedia.com—Official web site

 
Television broadcasting companies of the United States
Mass media companies of the United States
Mass media in Savannah, Georgia
Companies based in Savannah, Georgia
Mass media companies established in 1970
1970 establishments in Georgia (U.S. state)
Privately held companies based in Georgia (U.S. state)